Cavalier Municipal Airport  is a public airport located one mile (1.6 km) southwest of the central business district of Cavalier, in Pembina County, North Dakota, United States. It is owned by the Cavalier Airport Authority.

Facilities and aircraft

For the 12-month period ending July 1, 1998, the airport had 2,750 aircraft operations: 95% general aviation, 4% air taxi, and 1% military.

References

External links

Airports in North Dakota
Buildings and structures in Pembina County, North Dakota
Transportation in Pembina County, North Dakota